This is an index of articles relating to pesticides.

0–9

A

B

C

D

E

F

G

H

I

J

K

L

M

N

P

Q

R

S

T

U

V

W, X, Y, Z

See also
 List of fungicides

Index
Pesticides
Pesticide articles